Silesian Air is a defunct scheduled, passenger and cargo airline, formerly  based in Poland. Its main base was at Katowice International Airport.

Code data
ICAO Code: LSN (not current)
Callsign: SILESIAN (not current)

History
The airline was established in 2001 and started operations were started in 2003. Silesian Air was 100% owned by GTL. It has flown since 2005.

Fleet
The Silesian Air fleet consisted of 1 ATR 42-300 aircraft (at January 2005).

Defunct airlines of Poland
Airlines established in 2001
Airlines disestablished in 2005
2001 establishments in Poland
2005 disestablishments in Poland